is a two player puzzle video game developed and published by Sunsoft. It is based on the Hebereke series. Hebereke means drunk or untrustworthy. Popoon is an onomatopoeia for the sound made by the game pieces when they explode.

The game is a Puyo Puyo clone. Players align Popoons with others to make them explode.

Availability
According to the Video Arcade Preservation Society, via their website Killer List of Video Games, the arcade machine itself is very rare, if it still exists in cabinet form at all.

Gameplay

Hebereke's Popoon is a block-grouping game. There are four playable characters, each having different abilities. In story mode, the player is forced to play as Hebe and must battle certain characters. A defeated player may elect to resume play by using a continue. In versus mode, every playable character are immediately available to either player. Players can also select a handicap level (from 1 - 5) to increase or decrease the difficulty of the game.

In each round, pairs of Popoons of various colors (the set of colors varying with the character(s) chosen by the player(s)) descend from the top of the screen. These can be rotated and placed by the player. The immediate aim is to create groups of three blocks of the same color arranged either horizontally, vertically, or diagonally. When such a group is created, the member blobs blow up, disappearing from the screen. Any blobs above the disappearing group then drop to fill any resulting empty space.

Each time a player successfully creates a group, a Poro-poro will drop on the other player's screen in a random position. These poro-porous can be removed by the other player by placing a blob of the same color as the head such that it touches the head either horizontally or vertically. Both the head and the blob will disappear from the screen, in much the same manner as group of blobs, though no head will appear on the first player's screen as a result.

A player can sometimes cause multiple groups to disappear. This can happen simultaneously if the placement of a pair of blobs immediately causes two groups of blobs (or heads) to form or it can happen in a chain reaction, as the formation and disappearance of one group causes the dropping of any pieces above it, which can result in the formation of another group, and so on. If the groups in either process are of different colors then this is said to be a combination or "combo". The colors in a combo (or even a group) appear as small tiles in the lower of two panes in the middle of the screen and above the score-box.

While a combo of one color (simply an ordinary group) causes a single head to appear on the opponent's screen, a combo of two colors causes a full row of poro-porous to appear on the opponent's screen. Combos of three and four colors are much more dramatic, the precise effect depending on the player's character. Upcoming heads or special effects are kept track of by symbols placed by the players' characters in the upper of two panels in the middle of the screen.

A notable feature in Hebereke's Popoon is the constant bevy of sound effects as each player's character celebrates each group or combo by making nonsense sounds or yelling Japanese phrases.

Characters' combo abilities
When the player makes a combo of three or four colors different effects occur depending on the player's character:

Hebereke
Head Color: Blue
3 colors: Head flies towards opponents screen attached to body via a tether. A double row of heads then drops onto the opponent's screen.
4 colors: Flies off the screen on fire. The player's pieces are removed and a proportionate number of heads are dropped on the opponent's screen.

Oh-Chan
Head Color: Orange
3 colors: Uses magic electricity to turn pieces on opponent's screen into "frozen blocks" that can never be removed.
4 colors: Whisks away the bottom few rows of the player's pieces. A proportionate number of heads are dropped on the opponent's screen.

Sukezaemon
Head Color: Pink
3 colors: A giant hammer smashes through the player's pieces, removing them from the screen. A proportionate number of heads is dropped on the opponent's screen. 
4 colors: Hammers himself in the head popping his eyeballs out. Turns some of the opponent's pieces into heads.

Jennifer
Head Color: Green
3 colors: Causes opponent's screen to freeze up for 10 seconds. All the heads from all the groups the player made are dropped at once on the opponent's screen at the end of this time.
4 colors: Pukes up an iridescent blob which descends from the top of the player's screen. Wherever this blob is placed, several rows disappear and a proportionate number of heads are dropped on the opponent's screen.

Bobodori
Head Color: Light Purple
3 colors: Appears on the opponent's screen and turns it into an elevator which rises up and away. The opponent's screen then returns with many blobs having been turned into heads.
4 colors: A dragonfly flies from the top of her hat to the top of the opponent's screen. The beating wings of the dragonfly force all the opponent's pieces to drop at the maximum rate.

Utsujin
Head Color: Yellow
3 colors: Appears in a spaceship on the opponent's screen and drops several small copies of himself which proceed to walk around for a moment. Opponent's controls switch "left" and "right" for 10 seconds.
4 colors: Takes out a laser gun and fires a blast into the opponent's screen. The laser blast ricochets around several times, turning many blobs into heads.

Pen-Chan
Head Color: Purple
3 colors: For 10 seconds the opponent's screen is filled with an image of the crying child which obscures the opponent's vision.
4 colors: Sings and dances on the opponent's screen for 10 seconds, randomly permuting all the blobs and heads.

Unyohn
Head Color: Grey
3 colors: Surrounds himself with a shield on the player's screen, preventing the player from doing anything. While this is happening, any heads that would have dropped on the player's screen drop on the opponent's screen instead.
4 colors: Shoots a rocket from his hat which blows up all the pieces on the opponent's screen and replaces them with a proportionate number of heads.

Reception 

Hebereke's Popoon garnered generally favorable reception from critics. Computer and Video Gamess Rad Automatic and Mark Patterson praised the game's graphics, sound, and playability. While reckoning that the single-player mode was tame, both Automatic and Patterson were fond of its head-to-head mode, noting the use of special attacks and fast speed on higher levels. Video Games Dirk Sauer felt mixed regarding the visuals and sound effects, but found both its music and gameplay to be addictive, the latter of which he noted for being initially difficult. Nintendo Magazine Systems Paul Davies and Andy McVittie lauded its stylish and colorful imagery, audio, and compelling playability, but both felt that the game was less fun in single-player. Superjuegos Javier Iturrioz commended the diverse music, and quality of the characters' voices. However, Iturrioz felt that it did not offer any novelty compared to Puyo Puyo and stated that its graphics, while colorful, were limited by the game's nature. Total!s Josse and Atko gave positive remarks to the audiovisual presentation, gameplay, and overall longevity, finding it to be more fun than Super Puyo Puyo. Writing for the German edition, Michael Anton criticized its lack of depth but praised it for being a nice alternative to Tetris with usual gaudy Japanese graphics.

Games Worlds four reviewers compared the gameplay with Dr Robotnik's Mean Bean Machine. Nevertheless, they gave it an overall positive outlook. MAN!ACs Martin Gaksch regarded it to be a fun Columns clone, commending its different game modes but was annoyed at the lack of multiplayer variants. In contrast to the other critics, Mega Funs Götz Schmiedehause faulted the game for is visuals and audio. Play Times Ulf Schneider noted its difficulty level and limited options. Super Gamers three reviewers wrote that "Hebereke's Popoon relies more on chance than Super Puyo Puyo, which makes it just that crucial bit less satisfying." In 1995, Total! ranked the game as number 55 on its list of the top 100 SNES games, stating that it was "A bit like Kirby's Avalanche. If you like these puzzlers then it’s an absolute must." Hardcore Gaming 101s Federico Tiraboschi concurred with both Sauer and Schneider about the game's difficulty.

See also
Hebereke series

Notes

References

External links 
Hebereke no Popoon at Arcade-History.com

1993 video games
Arcade video games
Sunsoft games
Hebereke
Super Nintendo Entertainment System games
Video games developed in Japan
Windows games
Puzzle video games
Multiplayer and single-player video games